Events in the year 1854 in Norway.

Incumbents
Monarch: Oscar I

Events
 26 August – A new conscription law was sanctioned, under which all Norwegian men regardless of condition and position had an obligation to serve in the armed forces.
 1 September – The first Norwegian railway, Hovedbanen between Oslo and Eidsvoll, is opened. This also constitutes the establishment of the now state owned Norwegian State Railways.

Arts and literature

Births
9 February – Ole Georg Gjøsteen, educator and politician (died 1936)
14 March – Ole Olsen Malm, physician, veterinarian, civil servant and politician (died 1917).
25 March – Tycho Kielland, jurist and journalist (died 1904)
16 June – Herbjørn Gausta, artist (died 1924)
2 September – Hans Jæger, writer, philosopher and anarchist political activist (died 1910).
2 October – Mathias Larsen Blilie, politician
5 October – Haakon Ditlev Lowzow, military officer, politician and Minister (died 1915)
31 October – Otto Sverdrup, Arctic scientist and explorer (died 1930)

Full date unknown
Bernhard Brænne, politician and Minister (died 1927)
Knut Johannes Hougen, politician and Minister (died 1954)
Nils Olaf Hovdenak, politician and Minister (died 1942)
Ivar Kleiven, local historian and poet (died 1934)
Fredrik Anton Martin Olsen Nalum, politician and Minister (died 1935)
Christian Skredsvig, painter and writer (died 1924)
Johan Turi, first Sami author to publish work (died 1936)

Deaths
27 January – Andreas Samuelsen Vibstad, politician (born 1783)
1 April – Peter Motzfeldt, politician and Minister (born 1777)
29 July - Jørgen von Cappelen Knudtzon, businessman and patron of the arts (born 1784)
14 October – Aslak Hætta, Sami leader, executed (born 1824)
12 December – Georg Jacob Bull, jurist and politician (born 1785)
21 December - Oluf Borch de Schouboe, politician and Minister (born 1777)

Full date unknown
Samuel Mathiassen Føyn, ship-owner and politician (born 1786)
Nicolai Niels Nielsen, priest and politician (born 1777)
Johan Frederik Thorne, businessperson and politician (born 1801)

See also

References